Chania, also spelled Hania, is a city in Greece and the capital of the Chania regional unit.

The municipality has 108,642 inhabitants (2011). This consists of the city of Chania and several nearby areas, including Kounoupidiana (pop. 8,620), Mournies (pop. 7,614), Souda (pop. 6,418), Nerokouros (pop. 5,531), Daratsos (pop. 4,732), Perivolia (pop. 3,986), Galatas (pop. 3,166) and Aroni (pop. 3,003).

History

Early history

Chania is the site of the Minoan settlement the Greeks called Kydonia, the source of the word quince. It appears on Linear B as ku-do-ni-ja. Some notable archaeological evidence for the existence of this Minoan city below some parts of today's Chania was found by excavations in the district of Kasteli in the Old Town. This area appears to have been inhabited since the Neolithic era. The city reemerged after the end of the Minoan period as an important city-state in Classical Greece, one whose domain extended from Chania Bay to the feet of the White Mountains. The first major wave of settlers from mainland Greece was by the Dorian Greeks who came around 1100 BC. Kydonia was constantly at war with other Cretan city-states such as Aptera, Phalasarna and Polyrrinia and was important enough for the Kydonians to be mentioned in Homer's Odyssey (xix.200). In 69 BC, the Roman consul Caecilius Metellus defeated the Cretans and conquered Kydonia to which he granted the privileges of an independent city-state. Kydonia reserved the right to mint its own coins until the 3rd century AD.

Byzantine and Arab era

The early Christian period under Byzantine rule (First Byzantine Period, 395–824 AD) and the rule of the Arabs, who called the settlement Al Hanim ("the Inn"), are not well documented. Under the Arabs, the Christian population was persecuted and moved to the mountains. The Byzantine Empire retook the city in 961 AD (Second Byzantine Period, until 1204 AD). In this period the Arabic name of the city was changed into Greek Chania. Byzantines began to strongly fortify the city in order to prevent another Arab invasion, using materials from the ancient buildings of the area. By this time Chania was the seat of a bishopric, which would be known under Venetian rule as Roman Catholic Diocese of La Canea and later become the Latin titular see of Cydonia.

Venetian era

After the Fourth Crusade (1204) and the fall of Byzantium in the Hellenic area, Crete was given to Bonifacio, Marquess of Montferrat. He in turn chose to sell it to the Venetians for 100 silver marks. In 1252 the Venetians managed to subdue the Cretans but in 1263, their rivals of Genoa, with local support, seized the city under the leadership of Enrico Pescatore, count of Malta, and held it until 1285, when the Venetians returned. Chania was chosen as the seat of the Rector (Administrator General) of the region and flourished as a significant commercial centre of a fertile agricultural region.

The Venetian rule was initially strict and oppressive but slowly the relations between the two parts improved. Contact with Venice led to close intertwining of Cretan and Venetian cultures, without, however, the Cretans losing their Greek Orthodox nature. The city's name became La Canea and its fortifications were strengthened, giving Chania the form that it still has today. On the other hand, after the fall of Constantinople in 1453, many priests, monks and artists took refuge in Crete and reinforced the Byzantine religion and culture on the island. The city of Chania during the period that followed was a blend of Byzantine, Venetian, and Classical Greek cultural elements. Many of the important buildings of the town were built during this era and the intellectual activities (written word, music, education) were also promoted.

Ottoman era

During the opening months of the Cretan War (1645–1669) the city's walls did not prevent an Ottoman army from capturing it from the Venetians after a two-month siege. Many Cretans fled to escape persecution, many others were slaughtered or converted to Islam, while numerous Turkish Muslim settlers arrived changing the ethnic mix of the city. 

Muslims resided mainly in the eastern quarters, Kastelli and Splantzia, where they converted the Dominican church of St Nicholas into the central Sovereign's Mosque (Turkish: Hünkar Camısı). They also built new mosques such as the Küçük Hasan Pasha Mosque or Yali Mosque on the harbour. Public baths (hamam), and fountains were a feature of the Ottoman city. The pasha of Crete resided in Chania.

The city remained under Ottoman control despite fighting during the Greek War of Independence (1821-29), the Cretan Revolt (1866–1869) and the Cretan Revolt (1878). Due to the island's mixture of Muslim and Christian residents, Crete was the subject of international debate between the European great powers, most notably at the Treaty of Berlin (1878) which resulted in the Pact of Halepa. During the 19th and early 20th century inter-ethnic violence on Crete eventually led to the mass migration of the island's local Muslim population to other Mediterranean islands or coastal cities. Mass conversions also occurred. The population exchange between Greece and Turkey in 1922 resulted in the deportation of the island's last Muslim residents.

Modern era

In 1898, during the final moves towards independence and enosis—union with Greece—the Great Powers made Chania the capital of the semi-autonomous Cretan State ("Kritiki Politeia"), with Prince George of Greece, the High Commissioner of Crete living here. During these years Crete issued its own stamps and money. This was a very important transitional period when, no longer an isolated vilayet of the Ottoman Empire, the city became more cosmopolitan and flourishing, regaining its role as the crossroad of civilizations, influenced by Europe as well as by the East. Many important buildings were built during this era, intellectual and artistic societies were created and a new class of local aristocracy brought a different atmosphere to the everyday life of the town. The district of Halepa has many fine neoclassical embassies and consulates dating from this period.

However the main goal was enosis with Greece, which came after Eleftherios Venizelos's constant opposition to Prince George's rule over Crete. The series of conflicts includes the Therisos revolt in 1905, which overthrew Prince George and brought Alexandros Zaimis to rule Crete. Finally, in 1908, Venizelos managed to establish a revolutionary government, recognized by the Great Powers. His later election as the prime minister of Greece (1910) eventually led to Crete's union with Greece on 1 December 1913, following the Balkan Wars. The Greek flag was raised for the first time at Fort Firka in the Old Harbour in the presence of Venizelos and King Constantine.

Due to the popularity of Venizelos, Chania as with most of Crete remained staunchly pro-Venizelist, pro-Liberal and later pro Republican in the National Schism and the interwar period. The only attempt to overthrow the monarchist Metaxas Regime occurred in the city with the failed 28 July 1938 uprising.

Chania in World War II

Another important period for the city of Chania was the invasion and occupation by German forces during World War II. The British force that faced the German paratroopers during the Battle Of Crete in 1941, had artillery elements over the hill of Dexameni in the south of the city. These elements bombarded the German forces in the Maleme airfield undetected, until they ran out of ammunition. George II of Greece stayed in a villa near the village of Perivolia outside Chania before escaping to Egypt. Part of the city was bombed and a significant proportion of the area's population was either executed or imprisoned due to participation in the resistance against the German rule. The Jewish community of Chania was also eliminated during the German occupation. Most of them were transported off the island by the Nazi occupiers in 1944. Tragically, a British torpedo sank the ship Tanais, which was carrying most of the Jewish prisoners.

Post–World War II era

The city of Chania slowly regained its normal pace of development during the 1950s, trying to overcome the difficulties that the war had left in its aftermath. During the 1970s, Crete became a major tourist destination for Greek and international tourists, something that gave a significant boost to the city's economy and affected the everyday life and the overall culture of the locals. The capital of Crete was moved to Heraklion in 1971. 

Since the 1990s, the city of Chania has entered a new era, mainly due to construction and infrastructure such as a new airport, port and educational facilities, and it is considered a prominent tourist resort in the Mediterranean Sea.

Geography
 

Cityscape
The city of Chania can be divided into two parts: the old town and the modern city which is the larger one. The old town is situated next to the old harbour and is the matrix around which the whole urban area was developed. It used to be surrounded by the old Venetian fortifications that started to be built in 1538.  Of them, only the eastern and western parts have survived. From the south, the old town is continuous with the new, and from the north the physical border is the sea. The centre of the modern city is the area extending next to the old town and especially towards the south.

The old town 

The borders of the Old Town are the partly destroyed old Venetian wall (and bulwarks) and this has been the cradle of all the civilizations which were developed in the area. The central part of the old town is named Kasteli and has been inhabited since Neolithic times (ancient Kydonia). It is located on a small hill right next to the seafront and has always been the ideal place for a settlement due to its secure position, its location next to the harbour and its proximity to the fertile valley in the south. Nowadays it is a bit more quiet than the neighbouring areas of the west part of the district. The Splantzia quarter (next to the east part of Kasteli) is also largely untouched.

The main square of the Old Town (next to the west end of Kasteli) is Eleftherios Venizelos Square, also known as Syntrivani (from Turkish şadırvan 'fountain'). It is the heart of the tourist activities in the area. Next to this (on the west side) lies the Topanas district, which was the Christian quarter during the Ottoman period. Its name comes from the Venetian ammunition warehouse (Turkish tophane), which was located there. The Jewish quarter (Evraiki or Ovraiki) was located at the north-west of the Old Town, behind the harbour and within the borders of Topanas. The Topanas area has many narrow alleys and old buildings, some of which have been restored as hotels, restaurants, shops and bars. This makes it a popular place especially during the warm period (April–October). In the winter, it still remains a centre of activities (especially for nightlife).

Finally, a very distinctive area of the Old Town is the harbour itself and generally the seafront. Akti Tompazi, Akti Kountouriotou and Akti Enoseos (marina) all feature several historical buildings and nightlife. The main street that combines the modern town with the old town is Halidon Street.

The modern city 

The modern part of Chania is where most locals live and work. It is less traditional than the old town, but there are still areas of some historical interest. 

The oldest district (early 18th century) of the modern city is Nea Hora (meaning "New Town") which is located beyond the west end of the old town. It is a developing area with narrow old lanes leading to a small fishing harbour. 

The district of Koum Kapi (the Venetians had first named it "Sabbionara", which means "the Gate of the Sand", the same as "Koum Kapi") situated beyond the walls at the eastern part of the old town, was also one of the first places to be inhabited outside the fortification walls. Initially, it was home for the "Halikoutes", a group of Bedouins from North Africa who had settled there in the last years of Ottoman rule. Nowadays it is a developing area with many cafes, bars and restaurants on its beach. 

In the same era the district of Halepa began to grow to the east of the city and used to be home for the local aristocracy. Some of the historical buildings of the area (including old embassies of foreign countries) had been destroyed or abandoned during the later decades of the 20th century, and it was only recently when some interest was shown for the restoration of the remaining ones.

Other historical buildings in the area include Eleftherios Venizelos's House (built 1876-1880), the old French school (now property of the Technical University of Crete, housing the Department of Architecture), the Church of Agia Magdalini (built 1901-1903), The "Palace" (built 1882, house of Prince George during the period of the Cretan independence) and The Church of Evangelistria (built 1908–1923). Part of the marine area of Halepa is called Tabakaria, where a unique architectural complex of old leather processing houses is situated.

Apart from the previously mentioned older districts of the modern part of the town, several new residential areas have been developed during the 20th century, like Agios Ioannis, Koumbes, Lentariana, Pachiana and Pasakaki. Sections of the city centre are dominated by colourless medium-height block buildings, typical of the urbanization period of Greece (1950–1970). However, there are still some neoclassical houses, especially in the eastern part of Chania. There are some parks and several sports grounds, the most important being the Venizeleio Stadium of Chania and the Swimming Pool at Nea Hora. The 1913 indoor market ("Agora"), is on the edge of the old town and is popular with tourists and locals alike. Some other important sites of the newer urban area are The Court House ("Dikastiria", built late in the 19th century), the Public Gardens ("Kipos", created in 1870), the Garden Clock-Tower ("Roloi", built in 1924–1927), the Episcopal Residence (Bishop's residence, "Despotiko", built in the early 19th century) and the House of Manousos Koundouros (built in 1909), the Cultural Centre ("Pnevmatiko Kentro"). The central largest squares in Chania are the Market Square ("Agora"), the Court House Square ("Dikastiria") and the "1866 Square".

Since the 1990s, there has been a profound movement of Chania residents towards the suburbs, as well as towards areas around the city which used to be rural, mainly around Kounoupidiana in the Akrotiri Peninsula.

Climate

The city has a subtropical Mediterranean climate (Köppen: Csa), with sunny dry summers and very mild rainy winters. During the period between April and October, clear-sky weather is almost an everyday feature. The atmosphere is always warm, but fierce heat waves (temperatures above 38 °C) are not very common, since the prevailing Etesian winds ("Meltemia") blow from northern directions and pleasantly moderate the conditions. Intervals of sunny days are frequent during the windy and rainy winter as well. Snow and frost are rare near the coast, with very few exceptions, like the snowstorm on 13 February 2004, when  of snow accumulated in the urban area, causing general chaos. The last significant snowstorm happened on 8 January 2017 when the whole city and the old harbour was blanketed by snow. However, such cold days can be followed by much warmer and sunny weather. Minor early heat waves can occur in March or April, during a Saharan dust event, whose main feature is the strong and hot katabatic wind from the south, which is a type of Sirokos (σιρόκος) and is called "Livas" (i.e. the wind from Libya) by the Greeks.

The adjacent chart is based on data recorded during 1958–1997.

Topography

The climate in Chania is further complemented due to the terrain and can vary throughout its regions and elevations and according to its topography. At the south lies the mountain range of Lefka Ori. Furthermore, prevailing winds, such as those of the West side and South of Crete, in addition to the North side—all interact to form its climate.

Government 

The municipality of Chania was formed in the 2011 local government reform by the merger of the following seven former municipalities, that became municipal units:

 Akrotiri
 Chania
 Eleftherios Venizelos
 Keramia
 Nea Kydonia
 Souda
 Theriso

The municipality forms the eastern shore of Chania Bay (Kolpos Chanion Κόλπος Χανίων) and is bordered by Platanias (6) to the west, Sfakia (7) to the south and Apokoronas (2) to the east.

Culture

There are several museums, art galleries, theatre and music groups, educational and research institutions within the city.

The most important museums in Chania are:

 Chania's new Archaeological Museum at 15 Skra Str. Chalepa, Chania, replaces the former Archeological Museum of Chania. The museum houses findings from different parts of the region and from several historical and prehistorical periods.
 Folklore Museum (Old Town)
 Historical Archive (the second most important in Greece)
 Nautical Museum of Crete (Old Town)
 Municipal Art Gallery
 Byzantine/Post-Byzantine Collection (Old Town)
 House of Eleftherios Venizelos
 Museum of Chemistry
 School life museum
 Museum of Typography, Chania

Several theatre groups are active in Chania with the most important being the Municipal and Regional Theatre of Crete (DI.PE.THE.K).  The repertoire includes old and contemporary plays from Greek and foreign writers. The Venizelian Conservatory of Music ("Odeion", established 1931) is also one of the most important cultural societies in Crete. A recent attempt from the municipality to create a chamber music group named "Sinfonietta" has been successful and its performances throughout the year have enriched the cultural event calendar of the city. There is also a significant community of people who focus on alternative/indie music as well as jazz and bands performing modern musical styles. A number of traditional [Cretan] musicians are also active in town.

There are five cinemas (two of them open-air), concentrating both in commercial and independent movies and occasionally organizing small festivals. 

There are numerous cafes, restaurants and bars throughout the Old Town and especially around the old Venetian harbour, at Enetiki Tafros (Venetian moat) and at Splantzia square, but also along the waterfront of the Koum Kapi and Nea Hora neighbourhoods. In summer, the bars and restaurants at Platanias and Agia Marina are also busy.

During the summer period a variety of cultural events take place on a daily basis. Theatrical plays, concerts and several exhibitions from Greek and foreign artists are organized either by the municipality or by individuals. A venue which hosts many of these events is a theater located in the east bulwark of the Old Town ("Anatoliki Tafros"). Also, several festivals, conferences and sport events take place in Chania, especially between May and September. The Venizeleia athletics competition is one of the most noteworthy events of the year. 

A major role in the city's cultural life is played by the Municipal Cultural Corporation of Chania (DI.P.E.X.) which organizes a significant part of the events taking place throughout the year.

There is a French, a German, an Italian and a Swedish consulate in Chania.

Sports

Water sports are very popular in Chania. The local water polo team, Nautical Club of Chania, N.O.X. has managed to be a protagonist in the primary league of the Greek national championship for years. Several athletes of this team have also played extensively for the Greece men's national water polo team, which has achieved major international successes.

Football and basketball are also very popular in the town, however not as successful. The main football teams are PAE Chania (whose home ground is the Perivolia Municipal Stadium), and "Ionia". Platanias FC (based in the nearby town of Platanias) gained 36 points in the football championship in the 2013 Super League.

The main clubs for athletics are "Eleftherios Venizelos" and "Kydon". The "Antisfairisi" club is specialized in tennis, table tennis and also has a significant tradition in chess. Many of the above sports are being practiced in the Stadium of Chania, built in 1935 with the financial support of Elena Venizelou, then wife of Eleftherios Venizelos. 

There is also an open swimming pool for water sports in Nea Chora. A new indoor one which has been built on the nearby Akrotiri Peninsula in 2006, but has not opened to the public yet because of the estimated operational costs.  A modern indoor stadium for basketball, volleyball and more, called Chania Kladissos Indoor Hall, has also been built between 2002 and 2005 near Nea Chora (Kladisos area).

There is a very active climbing and hiking club (Greek Mountaineering Club of Chania, E.O.S. Chanion) organizing weekly excursions of varying difficulty on the mountains of Crete and several other longer term missions in mainland Greece and abroad.

Education and research

Educational institutions located at the greater area of the city are:

 Technical University of Crete
 The Chania branch of the Technological Educational Institute of Crete
 The Mediterranean Agronomic Institute of Chania
 The Merchant Marine Academy of Crete (AEN KRITIS)

Other research and intellectual institutes and societies in Chania are:

 The National Research Foundation "Eleftherios K. Venizelos"
 The Mediterranean Architecture Centre (KAM)
 The Institute of Olive Tree and Subtropical Plants of Chania
 The Institute of Cretan Law
 The Historical, Laographical and Archaeological Society of Crete
 Institute of Regional Press, Chania

Primary and secondary schools are mainly public in Chania (as in all cities in Greece). However, there has been a slow development of some private high schools recently. Among the "Eniaia Lykeia" (Unified Upper Secondary Schools) of the town there is an autonomous Ecclesiastical Lyceum in Agios Mattheos.

Economy

Two main sources of wealth in Chania are agriculture and tourism. A big portion of the city's residents (not necessarily farmers) own from few to many decares of agricultural land where several plants are being cultivated, the most common ones being olive trees and citrus. Other important products include wine, avocados, dairy etc. Apart from the traditional ways of cultivation, some of the producers have concentrated on practicing new methods in order to promote organic food.  The organization of the Agricultural August has been a recent attempt to promote local quality products including a series of activities organised by the Prefecture of Chania since 1999 has proved very successful.

On the other hand, starting from the early 1970s, tourism has developed rapidly. Nowadays the tertiary sector is becoming more and more important for the locals, since an increasing number of them are participating in the business. Agrotourism and ecotourism are forms of tourism which are significantly developing lately. 

There is also some secondary industry with focus on the processing-packaging of agricultural products (some of them export oriented) or manufacture products that support the agricultural production. 

An important centre of the economic activities in the town is the Chania Chamber of Commerce and Industry (E.B.E.X.).

Health care

The main hospital in the city is the General Hospital "Agios Georgios". Other health institutions include the Crete Naval Hospital, the branch of the National Centre for Emergency Medical Care (E.K.A.B.), and the Clinic of Chronic Disease. The Chania branch of the Organisation Against Drugs (Ο.ΚΑ.ΝΑ.) opened in 2003.

The city has a number of private clinics (e.g., Iasis and Central Clinic of Chania), as well as medical centres specialising in various areas.

Transport
The city is served by Chania International Airport (IATA code: CHQ) 14 km from Chania on the Akrotiri Peninsula. The airport is named after Daskalogiannis, a Sfakiot hero who was skinned by the Ottomans in the 18th century.

Souda also hosts Crete Naval Base, a major Greek and NATO base.

Notable residents

 Elpis Melena (1818–1899), born as Marie Espérance von Schwartz, German writer
 Eleftherios Venizelos (1864–1936), prime minister of Greece 1910–1920, 1924, 1928–1932, 1933; widely considered as the most important statesman of modern Greece born in the village Therisso
 Alexis Minotis (1898–1990), stage and screen actor active between the 1930s–1980s
 Constantine Mitsotakis (1918–2017), politician, prime minister of Greece 1990–1993, and later the honorary president of the New Democracy party
 George Psychoundakis (1920–2006), Cretan WW II hero and author
 John Craxton (1922–2009), painter and British honorary consul
 Maro Douka (1947–), Greek novelist
 Ioanna Karystiani (1952–), Greek novelist
 Christos Sartzetakis  (1929–), President of the Third Hellenic Republic from 1985 to 1990
 Mikis Theodorakis  (1925–2021), Greek composer
 Nikos Christodoulakis (1952–), Greek politician, economics professor and electronics engineer, Minister for Economy and Finance of Greece from 2001 to 2004
 Nana Mouskouri (1934–), Greek singer, one of the top-selling female singers of all time
 John Aniston (born in 1933), actor and father of well-known American actress Jennifer Aniston
 Eftichios Vlahakis (1935-2014), Greek-American entrepreneur
 Charis Galanakis (1981–), Greek agricultural, food and environmental scientist

Twin towns – sister cities

Chania is twinned with:

 Engomi, Cyprus
 Famagusta, Cyprus
 Paphos, Cyprus
 Polis, Cyprus
 Axioupoli, Greece
 Ermoupoli, Greece
 Karpathos, Greece
 Wellington, New Zealand

Gallery

See also
 Cretan cuisine
 Chania Power Station
 List of settlements in the Chania regional unit
 Mount Tityros
 Presentation of the Virgin Mary Cathedral, Chania (Greek Orthodox)
 Assumption Cathedral, Chania (Roman Catholic)

References

External links

 Municipality of Chania
 Chania - A City Of Many Tales—guide
 Explore Chania – Travel Guide – Vacation & Trip Ideas—guide

 
Capitals of former nations
Capitals of Greek states
Cities and towns in Greece
Greek prefectural capitals
Mediterranean port cities and towns in Greece
Minoan sites in Crete
Municipalities of Crete
Populated coastal places in Greece
Populated places in Chania (regional unit)
Port cities of the Aegean Sea